Wahid Khan was an Indian surbahar and sitar player. He was the son of Imdad Khan and belonged to the Imdadkhani gharana or Etawah gharana of classical music.

Early life
Wahid Khan was born in Etawah, Uttar Pradesh. He was still quite young when his father Imdad Khan moved to Kolkata from Etawah with his family. In Kolkata the family lived in the house of the connoisseur Taraprasad Ghosh, where Imdad Khan trained his sons, Wahid Khan and Enayat Khan, in sitar and surbahar. Wahid Khan specialised in the surbahar while Enayat Khan specialised in sitar.

Wahid Khan, at a very young age, was first initiated into Dhrupad, Khayal and Thumri and then trained extensively on the Sitar and Surbahar, by Imdad Khan for many years.

Performing career
Imdad Khan, later, moved out of Kolkata to settle in Indore as the Court-musician of the Maharaja Holkar of Indore. His sons Enayat Khan and Wahid Khan accompanied him to Indore. There Imdad Khan died, following which Enayat Khan left Indore and returned to Kolkata, while Wahid Khan was appointed the court musician of the Indore court, where he lived for 18 years on a very high salary. Wahid Khan also served the Patiala court for three years as a court musician. He was also the court musician of the Nizam of Hyderabad.

Wahid Khan was a regular performer at All India Radio. He also performed all over India and received numerous awards and medals from the famous institutions of Tikamgarh, Rewa, Baroda, Mysore, Dhaulpur, etc.

Wahid Khan also appeared in filmmaker Satyajit Ray’s international award winning film Jalsaghar (The Music Room, 1958) where he performs on the surbahar in one of the scenes.

Personal life
Wahid Khan is the paternal uncle of noted sitar player Vilayat Khan and the surbahar player Imrat Khan. His grandson is Shahid Parvez. His brother Enayat Khan was also a sitar and a surbahar player.

Awards
 Felicitated by the Governor of Bombay
 First instrumentalist to receive the coveted President's Award (now Sangeet Natak Akademi Award)

Discography
Released 78rpm recordings:
 Khamaj     (Vilambit Gat-toda) on the Sitar
 Pilu       (Drut Gat) on the Sitar
 Bhimpalasi (Alap, Jod-Jhala) on the Surbahar

References

 For reference see the book "Hamare Sangeet Ratna" by Laxmi Narayan Garg

 Sangeet Natak Award Winners 

Sitar players
Hindustani instrumentalists
Indian male classical musicians
Indian Muslims
Etawah gharana
Pupils of Imdad Khan
Recipients of the Sangeet Natak Akademi Award